The Rough Guide To Desert Blues is a world music compilation album originally released in 2010. Desert blues refers to the music of the Mandinka and related nomad groups of the Sahara, who perform a style of music considered the root of the American Blues genre. This was first popularized in the West by Ali Farka Touré and has more recently been carried by a new wave of artists such as Tinariwen.

Part of the World Music Network Rough Guides series, the album contains two discs: an overview of the genre on Disc One, and a "bonus" Disc Two highlighting Etran Finatawa. Disc One features nine Malian tracks, two Sahrawi, and one each from Mauritania and Niger. The compilation was produced by Phil Stanton, co-founder of the World Music Network.

Critical reception

The album met positive reviews upon release. Robert Christgau called the compilation an "accessible variant" of the Rough Guide to the Music of the Sahara. He went on to include it in his top albums of 2010. Chris Nickson of AllMusic named it a "thorough introduction" to desert blues but called the Amadou & Mariam track "the odd one out", claiming it doesn't represent the genre. David Maine of PopMatters said that while albums in the series could be hit-and miss, this one had "far more hits than misses." Calling Tinariwen "the greatest band in the world right now, bar none", Maine explained that he'd long wondered whether similar acts were "ripping off" Tinariwen, and that the album had emphatically proven that they are "not simply mimicking" the band's success.

Track listing

Disc One

Disc Two
All tracks on Disc Two are performed by Etran Finatawa.

References

External links
 
 

2010 compilation albums
World Music Network Rough Guide albums
Desert blues albums